Robert Swanson (August 20, 1912 – June 13, 1940) was an American racecar driver.

Swanson won the first Turkey Night Grand Prix midget-car race in 1934.  At the 1939 Indianapolis 500, he was involved in the accident that killed defending champion Floyd Roberts.  Thrown out of his car when Roberts hit him, Swanson lay unconscious on the track as the car overturned and caught fire.  His lucky escape proved to be only a temporary reprieve, as Swanson was killed a year later while attempting to qualify for a midget car race.

In a 2006 interview, motorsports reporter Chris Economaki called him 'the best racing driver he ever saw'.

Swanson was inducted in the National Midget Auto Racing Hall of Fame.

Indianapolis 500 results

References

External links

1912 births
1940 deaths
Sportspeople from Minneapolis
Racing drivers from Minneapolis
Racing drivers from Minnesota
Indianapolis 500 drivers
AAA Championship Car drivers
Racing drivers who died while racing
Sports deaths in Ohio